The 1975 Cal Poly Mustangs football team represented California Polytechnic State University, San Luis Obispo as a member of the California Collegiate Athletic Association (CCAA) during the 1975 NCAA Division II football season. Led by eighth-year head coach Joe Harper, Cal Poly compiled an overall record of 6–4 with a mark of 3–1 in conference play, placing second in the CCAA. The Mustangs played home games at Mustang Stadium in San Luis Obispo, California.

Schedule

Team players in the NFL
The following Cal Poly Mustang players were selected in the 1976 NFL Draft.

References

Cal Poly
Cal Poly Mustangs football seasons
Cal Poly Mustangs football